Night Songs is a studio album by Barry Manilow, released by Stiletto Entertainment on March 25, 2014. The album reached peak positions of number eight on the Billboard 200 and number three on Billboard Top Independent Albums  chart, and earned Manilow a Grammy Award nomination for Best Traditional Pop Vocal Album.

Track listing
 "I Fall in Love Too Easily" (Sammy Cahn)
 "Alone Together" (Arthur Schwartz/Howard Dietz)
 "Blame It on My Youth" (Oscar Levant/Edward Heyman)
 "I Get Along Without You Very Well" (Hoagy Carmichael)
 "You're Getting to Be a Habit with Me"
 "It Amazes Me"
 "But Not for Me"
 "It's a New World"
 "While We're Young"
 "You Don't Know What Love Is"
 "Ac-Cent-Tchu-Ate the Positive" (Johnny Mercer)
 "My One and Only Love"
 "I've Never Been in Love Before"
 "I Walk a Little Faster" (Cy Coleman)
 "Here's That Rainy Day" (Jimmy Van Heusen)
 "Some Other Time" (Bernstein/Comden/Green)

References

2014 albums
Barry Manilow albums
Easy listening albums